The 1940 Idaho Southern Branch Bengals football team was an American football team that represented the University of Idaho, Southern Branch (later renamed Idaho State University) as an independent during the 1940 college football season. In their sixth and final season under head coach Guy Wicks, the team compiled a 3–5 record and were outscored by their opponents by a total of 185 to 96.

Schedule

Notes

References

External links
 1941 Wickiup football section — yearbook summary of the 1940 season

Idaho Southern Branch
Idaho State Bengals football seasons
Idaho Southern Branch Bengals football